Dexagria is a genus of true flies in the family Sarcophagidae.

Species
D. ushinskyi Rohdendorf, 1978
D. kangdingica Feng & Deng, 2010

References 

Sarcophagidae
Schizophora genera